Edificio Allianz (Torre Allianz) is a skyscraper in Barcelona, Catalonia, Spain. Completed in 1993, it has 20 floors and rises 77 meters. It is the 41st tallest building in Barcelona. The building belongs to the Allianz Company. It lies on Carrer de Tarragona street 103, near Plaça d'Espanya and three other skyscrapers: Edificio Tarragona, Hotel Torre Catalunya, Torre Núñez y Navarro.

See also 

 List of tallest buildings and structures in Barcelona

References 

Skyscraper office buildings in Barcelona

Office buildings completed in 1993
1993 establishments in Spain